Charlotte Söderström (born 1977) is a Swedish billionaire. She is an heir of the fashion company Hennes & Mauritz (H&M), which was founded by her grandfather Erling Persson in 1947. As of June 2020, her net worth is estimated at US$1.5 billion.

Early life
She grew up in Sweden, the daughter of Stefan Persson and Pamela Collett.

Career
She works H&M sponsorships and runs a stud farm.

Personal life
She is married with three children and lives in Stockholm.

References

1977 births
Living people
Date of birth missing (living people)
Swedish billionaires
Persson family